Rhexia aristosa is a species of flowering plants in the Melastomataceae known by the common names awned meadowbeauty and awnpetal meadowbeauty. It is native to the eastern United States, where it occurs on the coastal plain from New Jersey to Alabama.

This perennial herb produces stiff stems up to about 70 to 100 centimeters tall. The leaves are linear to lance-shaped and up to 5 centimeters tall. The flowers have lavender petals up to 2 centimeters long. Flowering occurs in June through September.

This species grows in several types of wetland, including bays, bogs, flatwoods, seasonally moist pools and meadows, and savannas. It is often a member of the flora in Carolina bays. It may grow in the understory of Taxodium ascendens with Panicum hemitomon, Polygala cymosa, Lobelia boykinii, Sagittaria spp., and Lachnanthes caroliniana. It is adapted to habitat that is prone to disturbance such as wildfire and flooding.

This species is threatened by the loss of its habitat, for example, the loss of Carolina bays when they are converted to agriculture and silviculture and other uses. During development, the local hydrology is altered, eliminating natural springs and causing polluting runoff. The bays are also altered during logging operations.

References

External links

aristosa
Flora of the United States